was a Japanese bureaucrat and politician who was Prime Minister of Japan from 1957 to 1960.

Known for his exploitative rule of the Japanese puppet state of Manchukuo in Northeast China in the 1930s, Kishi was nicknamed the "Monster of the Shōwa era" (昭和の妖怪; Shōwa no yōkai). Kishi later served in the wartime cabinet of Prime Minister Hideki Tōjō as Minister of Commerce and Vice Minister of Munitions, and co-signed the declaration of war against the United States on December 7, 1941.

After World War II, Kishi was imprisoned for three years as a suspected Class A war criminal. However, the U.S. government did not charge, try, or convict him, and eventually released him as they considered Kishi to be the best man to lead a post-war Japan in a pro-American direction. With U.S. support, he went on to consolidate the Japanese conservative camp against perceived threats from the Japan Socialist Party in the 1950s. Kishi was instrumental in the formation of the powerful Liberal Democratic Party (LDP) through a merger of smaller conservative parties in 1955, and thus is credited with being a key player in the initiation of the "1955 System", the extended period during which the LDP was the overwhelmingly dominant political party in Japan.

As prime minister, Kishi's mishandling of the 1960 revision of the U.S.-Japan Security Treaty led to the massive 1960 Anpo protests, which were the largest protests in Japan's modern history and which forced him to resign in disgrace.

His younger brother, Eisaku Satō, also was a prime minister. Kishi was the maternal grandfather of Shinzo Abe, twice prime minister, and defense minister Nobuo Kishi.

Early life and career 
Kishi was born Nobusuke Satō in Tabuse, Yamaguchi Prefecture, the son of a sake brewer from a once illustrious samurai family that had recently fallen on hard times. His older brother, Ichirō Satō, would go on to become a Vice Admiral in the Imperial Japanese Navy, and his younger brother, Eisaku Satō, would also go on to become a prime minister. Nobusuke attended an elementary school and middle school in Okayama, and then transferred to another middle school in Yamaguchi. When he was about to graduate from middle school, Nobusuke was adopted by his father's older brother, Nobumasa Kishi, adopting their family name. The Kishi family lacked a male heir, so they adopted Nobusuke in order to continue the family line.

Kishi passed the extremely difficult entrance examination to enter First High School in Tokyo, the most prestigious high school in the country, and then attended Tokyo Imperial University (now the University of Tokyo), where he graduated from the Faculty of Law in 1920 at the top of his class and with the highest grades in the university's history. While at the university, Kishi became a protégé of the right-wing legal scholar Shinkichi Uesugi. Because he studied German law under Uesugi, Kishi's views tended toward German-style statism, compared to the more progressive approaches favored by some of his classmates who studied English law. Upon graduation, Kishi entered the Ministry of Commerce and Industry. This was an unusual choice, because at the time, the most brilliant aspiring bureaucrats typically sought to enter the Home Ministry and eventually gain appointment as a prefectural governor. Some of Kishi's mentors even criticized his choice. However, Kishi was uninterested in administrative work, and aimed to be directly involved in Japan's economic development.

In 1926–27, Kishi traveled around the world to study industry and industrial policy in various industrialised states around the world, such as the United States, Germany, and the Soviet Union. Besides the Soviet Five-Year Plan, which left Kishi with an obsession with economic planning, Kishi was also greatly impressed with the labor management theories of Frederick Winslow Taylor in the United States, the German policy of industrial cartels and the high status of German technological engineers within the German business world. Kishi became known as one of the more prominent members of a group of "reform bureaucrats" within the Japanese government who favored a statist model of economic development with the state guiding and directing the economy.

Economic manager of Manchukuo

In the "Manchurian Incident" of September 1931, the Japanese Kwantung Army seized the Chinese region of Manchuria ruled by the warlord Zhang Xueliang (the "Young Marshal") and turned it into a puppet state called "Manchukuo." Although nominally ruled by Puyi, who had been the last emperor of Qing dynasty, Manchukuo was de facto a Japanese colony. All of the ministers in the Manchukuo government were Chinese or Manchus, but all of the deputy ministers were Japanese, and these were the men who really ruled Manchukuo. From the start, the Japanese Army sought to turn Manchukuo into an industrial powerhouse in support of the Japanese Empire and carried out a policy of forced industrialization. Reflecting the military's ideas about the "national defense state", Manchukuo's industrial development was focused completely upon heavy industry such as steel production for the purposes of arms manufacture.

Kishi has been described as the "mastermind" behind the industrial development of Japan's puppet state in Manchuria. Kishi had first come to the attention of the Kwantung Army officers as a rising star in the Ministry of Commerce and Industry who openly touted the policies of Nazi Germany and called for policies of "industrial rationalization" to eliminate capitalist competition in support of state goalsideas that accorded with the Army's idea of a "national defense state." In 1935, Kishi was appointed Manchukuo's Deputy Minister of Industrial Development. Kishi was given complete control of Manchukuo's economy by the military, with the authority to do whatever he liked just as long as industrial growth was increased.

In 1936, Kishi was one of the drafters of Manchukuo's first Five-Year Plan. Clearly modeled on the Soviet Union's First Five-Year Plan, Manchukuo's Five-Year Plan was intended to dramatically boost heavy industry in order to vastly increase production of coal, steel, electricity, and weapons for military purposes. In order to enact the new plan, Kishi persuaded the military to allow private capital into Manchukuo, successfully arguing that the military's policy of having state-owned corporations leading Manchukuo's industrial development was costing the Japanese state too much money. One of the new public-private corporations founded to assist in carrying out the Five-Year Plan was the Manchuria Industrial Development Company (MIDC), established in 1937, which attracted a staggering 5.2 billion yen in private investment, making it by far the largest capital project in the Japanese empire; by comparison, the total annual budget of Japan's national government was 2.5 billion yen in 1937 and 3.2 billion yen in 1938. The man handpicked by Kishi to lead the MIDC was his distant relative and old First High School classmate, Nissan Group founder Ayukawa Yoshisuke. As part of the deal, the Nissan Group's entire operations were supposed to be transferred over to Manchuria to form the basis of the new MIDC. The system that Kishi pioneered in Manchuria of a state-guided economy where corporations made their investments on government orders later served as the model for Japan's post-1945 development, and subsequently, that of South Korea and China as well.

In order to make it profitable for the zaibatsu to invest in Manchukuo, Kishi had a policy of lowering the wages of the workers to the lowest possible point, even below the "line of necessary social reproduction." The purpose of Manchukuo was to provide the industrial basis for the "national defense state," with American historian Mark Driscoll noting that, "Kishi's planned economy was geared towards production goals and profit taking, not competition with other Japanese firms; profit would come primarily from rationalizing labor costs as much as possible. The ne plus ultra of wage rationalization would be withholding pay altogetherthat is, unremunerated forced labor." Accordingly, the Japanese conscripted hundreds of thousands of Chinese as slave labor to work in Manchukuo's heavy industrial plants. In 1937, Kishi signed a decree calling for the use of slave labor to be conscripted both in Manchukuo and in northern China, stating that in these "times of emergency" (i.e. war with China), industry needed to grow at all costs while guaranteeing healthy profits for state and private investors. Starting in 1938 and continuing to 1945, about one million Chinese were taken every year to work as slaves in Manchukuo. The harsh conditions of Manchukuo were well illustrated by the Fushun coal mine, which at any given moment had about 40,000 men working as miners, of whom about 25,000 had to be replaced every year as their predecessors had died due to poor working conditions and low living standards.

Kishi showed little interest in upholding the rule of law in Manchukuo. Kishi expressed views typical of his fellow colonial bureaucrats when he disparagingly referred the Chinese people as "lawless bandits" who were "incapable of governing themselves". According to Kishi's subordinates, he saw little point in following legal or juridical procedures because he felt the Chinese were more akin to dogs than human beings and would only understand brute force. According to Driscoll, Kishi always used the term "Manshū" to refer to Manchukuo, instead of "Manshūkoku", which reflected his viewpoint that Manchukuo was not actually a state, but rather just a region rich in resources and 34 million people to be used for Japan's benefit. In his later years, Kishi recalled how "inhuman" treatment of Chinese people had become naturalized among the Japanese colonial elite, turning human beings into "mechanical instruments of the Imperial Army, non-human automatons, absolutely obedient" to their Japanese masters.

Tokyo's Pan-Asian rhetoric, where Manchukuo was a place where Manchus, Chinese, Japanese, Koreans, and Mongols would all to come together to live harmoniously in Pan-Asian peace, prosperity and brotherhood meant little to Kishi or the other Japanese bureaucrats governing Manchukuo. Kishi only associated with other Japanese during his time in Manchukuo and did not mix socially with Chinese or other ethnic groups. Instead, Kishi's dinner companions were fellow bureaucrats, businessmen seeking government contracts, Army officers and yakuza gangsters. The presence of the latter was due to Kishi's involvement with the opium trade; the Manchukuo State Opium Monopoly needed distributors to move its products around the world, which in turn required contacts with the underworld in the form of the yakuza. Additionally, Kishi used yakuza thugs to terrorize the Chinese workers in Manchukuo's factories into submission, and ensure that there were no strikes caused by the long hours, low pay and poor working conditions. Because the Kwantung Army expected to settle Manchukuo with millions of Japanese to solve the problem of overpopulation in Japan, after the Manchurian Incident the army generals had sought to curtail Han Chinese migration into Manchukuo. However, Kishi reversed these policies in 1935, arguing successfully to the generals that the yakuza would keep the Chinese workers in line and that to grow Manchukuo's industries required cheap Chinese labor to be exploited. At the same time, Kishi repeatedly expressed a disdain for Chinese people as impure and unclean. One of Kishi's closest friends and business partners, the yakuza gangster Yoshio Kodama, summed up his boss's thinking about the Chinese as follows: "We Japanese are like pure water in a bucket; different from the Chinese who are like the filthy Yangtze river. But be careful. If even the smallest amount of shit gets into our bucket, we become totally polluted. Since all the toilets in China empty into the Yangtze, the Chinese are soiled forever. We, however, must maintain our purity".

As a self-described "playboy of the Eastern world", Kishi was known during his four years in Manchukuo for his lavish spending amid much drinking, gambling, and womanizing. Kishi spent almost all of his time in Manchukuo's capital, Hsinking (modern Changchun, China) with the exception of monthly trips to Dalian on the world famous Asia Express railroad line, where he indulged in his passion for women in alcohol- and sex-drenched weekends. When not visiting the brothels of Manchuria, Kishi was demanding sex from the waitresses who served him at the expensive restaurants he patronized. When he was locked up in Sugamo prison in 1946 awaiting trial, he reminisced about his Manchukuo years: "I came so much, it was hard to clean it all up”. According to Driscoll, "photographs and written descriptions of Kishi during this period never fail to depict a giddy exuberance: laughing and joking while doling out money during the day and looking forward to drinking and fornicating at night." Kishi was able to afford his hedonistic, free-spending lifestyle as he had control over millions of yen with virtually no oversight, alongside being deeply involved in and profiting from the opium trade. Before returning to Japan in October 1939, Kishi is reported to have advised his colleagues in the Manchukuo government about corruption: "Political funds should be accepted only after they have passed through a 'filter' and been 'cleansed'. If a problem arises, the 'filter' itself will then become the center of the affair, while the politician, who has consumed the 'clean water', will not be implicated. Political funds become the basis of corruption scandals only when they have not been sufficiently 'filtered.'"

Minister in the Konoe and Tōjō governments

In 1939, Kishi became Vice Minister of Commerce in the government of Prince Fumimaro Konoe. Kishi intended to create within Japan the same sort of totalitarian "national defense state" that he had pioneered in Manchuria, but these plans ran into vigorous opposition from the zaibatsu, who accused him of being a communist, and Kishi was fired from his post in December 1940. However, Kishi entered the cabinet as Minister of Commerce under new prime minister Hideki Tōjō less than one year later, in October 1941. Kishi and General Tōjō had worked closely together in Manchuria, and Tōjō regarded Kishi as his protégé.

On 1 December 1941, Kishi voted in the Cabinet for war with the United States and Britain, and co-signed the declaration of war issued on 7 December 1941. Kishi was also elected to the Lower House of the Diet of Japan in April 1942 as a member of the Imperial Rule Assistance Association. Kishi's many connections with the business world and his organizational skills proved an asset to keeping Japan's war effort going despite growing obstacles. In 1943, the Ministry of Commerce was abolished and replaced with the newly created Ministry of Munitions. Kishi was forced to accept a demotion, becoming Vice Minister of Munitions as Tōjō concentrated power in his own hands by simultaneously serving as Prime Minister, Minister of War, and Minister of Munitions, although Kishi retained his status as a member of the cabinet. This demotion was the beginning of a rift in the relationship between the two men.

Meanwhile, Kishi increasingly became convinced that the war was unwinnable and that peace should be sought with the Americans. In July 1944, during the political crisis caused by the Japanese defeat at the Battle of Saipan, Tōjō attempted to save his government from collapse by reorganizing his cabinet. However, Kishi refused a request to resign, telling Tōjō he would only resign if the prime minister also resigned along with the entire cabinet, saying a partial reorganization was unacceptable. Despite Tōjō's tears as he begged Kishi to help him save his government, Kishi was unmoved. Kishi's actions succeeded in bringing down the Tōjō cabinet and led directly to Tōjō's replacement as prime minister with General Kuniaki Koiso.

In March 1945, Kishi founded a new political party, the National Salvation Society (Gokoku dōshikai), to oppose the Imperial Rule Assistance Association. Kishi took with him 32 members of the Diet into his party. The National Salvation Society was noteworthy because almost none of its members were connected to the zaibatsu; instead the Kishi's new party comprised small and middle-sized businessmen who had invested in Manchukuo during Kishi's time in Manchuria or who had benefited from state contracts during Kishi's time as Vice Minister of Munitions; senior executives at the "public policy corporations" Kishi had created for investments in Manchukuo; and ultra-nationalists who had participated in coup attempts in the 1930s.

Prisoner in Sugamo
After the Japanese surrender to the Allies in August 1945, Kishi, with other members of the former Japanese government, was held at Sugamo Prison as a suspected "Class A" war criminal by the order of the Supreme Commander of the Allied Powers. Kishi, Yakuza boss Yoshio Kodama, his friend Ryōichi Sasakawa, a preeminent fascist political fixer and Matsutarō Shōriki, the former president of the Yomiuri Shimbun, lived in the same prison cell and were never judged. Their fraternity formed in prison continued for the rest of their lives.

During this time, a group of influential Americans who had formed themselves into an "American Council on Japan" came to Kishi's aid, and lobbied the American government to release him as they considered Kishi to be the best man to lead a post-war Japan in a pro-American direction. The American Council on Japan included former ambassador to Japan Joseph C. Grew, Newsweek journalists Harry Kern and Compton Packenham, and corporate lawyer James L. Kauffman. Unlike Hideki Tōjō (and several other Cabinet members) who were put on trial, Kishi was released in 1948 and was never indicted or tried by the International Military Tribunal for the Far East. However, he remained legally prohibited from entering public affairs because of the Allied occupation's purge of members of the old regime.

During his time as a prisoner, Kishi had already begun plotting his political comeback. He conceived of the idea of building on his earlier "National Salvation Society" to establish a mass party uniting the more moderate socialists and conservatives into a "popular movement of national salvation," a populist party that would use statist methods to encourage economic growth and would mobilize all Japanese citizens to rally in support of its nationalist policies.

Return to politics 

When the prohibition on former government members was fully rescinded in 1952 with the end of the Allied occupation of Japan, Kishi returned to politics and was central in creating the "Japan Reconstruction Federation" (Nippon Saiken Renmei), drawing upon his earlier efforts with the National Salvation Society. Besides becoming Prime Minister, Kishi's main aim in politics was revise the American-imposed constitution, especially Article 9. Kishi wrote that in order for Japan to regain its status as a "respectable member (of) the community of nations it would first have to revise its constitution and rearm: If Japan is alone in renouncing war ... she will not be able to prevent others from invading her land. If, on the other hand, Japan could defend herself, there would be no further need of keeping United States garrison forces in Japan... Japan should be strong enough to defend herself."

Kishi's Japan Reconstruction Federation fared disastrously in the 1952 elections, and Kishi failed in his bid to be elected to the Diet. After that defeat, Kishi disbanded his party, and tried to join the Socialists; after being rebuffed, he reluctantly joined the Liberal Party instead. After being elected to the Diet as a Liberal in 1953, Kishi's main activities revolved around undermining the leader of the Liberal Party, Shigeru Yoshida, so he could become the Liberal leader in his place. Kishi's main avenues of attack were that Yoshida was far too deferential to the Americans and for the need to do away with Article 9. In April 1954 Yoshida expelled Kishi for his attempts to depose him as Liberal leader.

By this time, the very wealthy Kishi had well over 200 members of the Diet as his loyal followers. In November 1954, Kishi took his faction into the Democratic Party led by Ichirō Hatoyama. Hatoyama was the party leader, but Kishi was the party secretary, and crucially he controlled the party's finances, which thus made him the dominant force within the Democrats. Elections in Japan were very expensive, so few candidates to the Diet could afford the costs of an election campaign out of their own pockets or could fund-raise enough money for a successful bid for the Diet. As a result, candidates to the Diet needed a steady infusion of money from the party-secretariat to run a winning campaign, which made Kishi a powerful force within the Democratic Party as he determined which candidates received money from the party-secretariat and how much. As a result, Democratic candidates for the Diet either seeking election for the first time or reelection were constantly seeing Kishi to seek his favor. Reflecting Kishi's power as party secretary, Hatoyama was described as an omikoshi, a type of portable Shinto shrine carried around to be worshipped. Everyone bows downs and worships an omikoshi, but to move an omikoshi, it must be picked up and carried by somebody.

In February 1955, the Democrats won the general elections. On the day after Hatoyama was sworn in as prime minister, Kishi began talks with the Liberals about merging the two parties now that his arch-enemy Yoshida had stepped down as Liberal leader after losing the elections. In November 1955, the Democratic Party and Liberal Party merged to elect Ichirō Hatoyama as the head of the new Liberal Democratic Party. Within the new party, Kishi once again become the party secretary with control of the finances. Kishi had reassured the American ambassador John Allison that "for the next twenty five years it would be in Japan's best interests to cooperate closely with the United States." The Americans wanted Kishi to become Prime Minister and were disappointed when Tanzan Ishibashi, the most anti-American of the LDP politicians, won the party's leadership, leading an American diplomat to write the U.S had bet its "money on Kishi, but the wrong horse won." Just 65 days later, however, in February 1957, Ishibashi was forced to resign due to illness and Kishi was elected to lead his party and the nation as prime minister.

Prime Minister of Japan

Policy goals
In February 1957, Kishi became Prime Minister following the resignation of the ailing Tanzan Ishibashi. His main concerns were with foreign policy, especially with revising the 1952 U.S-Japan Security Treaty, which he felt had turned Japan into a virtual American protectorate. Revising the security treaty was understood to be the first step towards his ultimate goal of abolishing Article 9. Besides his desire for a more independent foreign policy, Kishi wanted to establish close economic relations with the various states of South-East Asia. Finally, Kishi wanted the Allies to commute the remaining sentences of the Class B and Class C war criminals still in serving their prison sentences, arguing that for Japan to play its role in the Cold War as a Western ally required forgetting about Japan's war crimes in the past.

Pursuit of an Asian Development Fund

In the first year of Kishi's term, Japan joined the United Nations Security Council, paid war reparations to Indonesia, signed a new commercial treaty with Australia, and signed peace treaties with Czechoslovakia and Poland. In 1957, Kishi presented a plan for a Japanese-dominated Asian Development Fund (ADF), which was to operate under the slogan "Economic Development for Asia by Asia", calling for Japan to invest millions of yen in Southeast Asia. With access to markets in China and North Korea cut off due to Cold War polarization, Japanese and American leaders alike looked to Southeast Asia as a market for Japanese goods and source of raw materials. Moreover, the Americans wanted more aid to Asia to spur economic growth that would stem the appeal of Communism, but were disinclined to spend the money themselves. The prospect of Japan spending some $500 million US in low interest loans and aid projects in Southeast Asia had the benefit from Kishi's viewpoint of improving his standing in Washington, and giving him more leverage in his talks to revise the U.S.-Japan Security Treaty.

In pursuit of the ADF, Kishi visited India, Pakistan, Burma, Thailand, Ceylon, and Taiwan in May 1957, asking the leaders of those states to join the ADF, but with the exception of Taiwan, which agreed to join, the other nations gave equivocal answers. In November, Kishi once again toured Southeast Asia to promote the idea of an ADF, this time visiting South Vietnam, Cambodia, Laos, Malaysia, Indonesia, the Philippines, Australia, and New Zealand. These countries, all of which Japan had attacked and/or occupied during World War II, also expressed ambivalence or disdain toward joining the proposed framework, with the sole exception of Laos, which was in desperate need of foreign aid at that time. Even in countries that were not occupied by Japan like India, Ceylon, and Pakistan, Kishi encountered obstacles. Indian Prime Minister Jawaharlal Nehru told Kishi during his visit to New Delhi that he wanted his nation to be neutral in the Cold War, and given that Japan was allied to the United States, joining the ADF would be in effect aligning India with the Americans. During his visit to Karachi, the Pakistani Prime Minister Huseyn Shaheed Suhrawardy told Kishi that he thought of himself as a "human being rather than an Asian first," and preferred bilateral over multilateral aid because a multilateral aid framework would put participating countries into competition with each other over aid distribution. In sum, bad memories of Japan's wartime depredations in the region, a suspicion of Japanese motives, an unwillingness to enter into neo-colonial relationship with Japan as suppliers of raw materials, Cold War neutralism, and a fear that America was secretly pulling the strings all contributed to the failure of Kishi's ambitious plans to create an Asian economic block reminiscent of "Greater East Asian Co-Prosperity Sphere" that Japan had claimed to be pursuing in World War II. Ultimately, even the United States was lukewarm about Kishi's project, so it was shelved for the time being, although it was later partially revived in the form of the Asian Development Bank.

Pursuit of treaty revision

Kishi's next foreign policy initiative was potentially even more difficult: reworking Japan's security relationship with the United States. Kishi always saw the system created by the Americans as temporary and intended that one day Japan would resume its role as a great power; in the interim, he was prepared to work within the American-created system both domestically and internationally to safeguard what he regarded as Japan's interests. In June 1957, Kishi visited the United States, where he was received with honor, being allowed to address a joint session of Congress, throwing the opening pitch for the New York Yankees in a baseball game in New York and being allowed to play golf at an otherwise all-white golf club in Virginia, which the American historian Michael Schaller called "remarkable" honors for a man who as a Cabinet minister had signed the declaration of war against the United States in 1941 and who had presided over the conscription of thousands of Koreans and Chinese as slave labor during World War II. The Vice President of the United States, Richard Nixon introduced Kishi to Congress as an "honored guest who was not only a great leader of the free world, but also a loyal and great friend of the people of the United States", apparently unaware or indifferent to the fact that Kishi had been one of the closest associates of General Tojo, hanged by the United States for war crimes in 1948.

In November 1957, Kishi laid down his proposals for a revamped extension of the US–Japan Mutual Security Treaty, and the Eisenhower administration finally agreed to negotiations on a revised version. The American ambassador Douglas MacArthur II (the nephew of the famous general) reported to Washington that Kishi was the most pro-American of the Japanese politicians, and if the U.S refused to revise the security treaty in Japan's favor, he would be replaced as Prime Minister by a more anti-American figure. The U.S. Secretary of State, John Foster Dulles, wrote in a memo to President Eisenhower that the United States was "at the point of having to make a Big Bet" in Japan and Kishi was the "only bet we had left in Japan." Meanwhile, Kishi was able to take advantage of a growing anti-US military base movement in Japan, as exemplified by the ongoing Sunagawa Struggle over proposed expansion of the US air base at Tachikawa and the explosion of anger in Japan over the Girard Incident, to insinuate to U.S. leaders that if the treaty were not revised the continued existence of U.S. bases in Japan might become untenable.

Anticipating public opposition to his plans for revising the security treaty, Kishi brought before the Diet a harsh "Police Duties Bill," which would give the police vastly expanded powers to crush demonstrations and to conduct searches of homes without warrants. In response to the police bill, a nationwide coalition of left-leaning civic organizations led by the Japan Socialist Party and the Sōhyō labor federation launched a variety of protest activities in the fall of 1958 with the aim of killing the bill. These protests succeeded in arousing public anger at the bill and Kishi was forced to withdraw it.

The 1960 Anpo Protests

In late 1959, it became clear that Kishi intended to break with longstanding precedent that prime ministers serve no more than two consecutive terms. Kishi hoped that by successfully revising the Security Treaty, he would have attained the political capital necessary to pull off this feat. In response to Kishi's break with tradition, Kishi's opponents within his own Liberal Democratic Party, who felt they had waited long enough for their chance at power, vowed to do whatever was necessary to bring about the end of his premiership. Meanwhile, final negotiations on the new treaty wrapped up in 1959, and in January 1960, Kishi traveled to Washington, D.C., where he signed the new treaty with President Eisenhower on January 19. During his visit to the United States, Kishi appeared on the January 25, 1960 cover of Time magazine, which declared that the Prime Minister's "134 pound body packed pride, power and passion—a perfect embodiment of his country's amazing resurgence" while Newsweek called him the "Friendly, Savvy Salesman from Japan" who had created the "economic powerhouse of Asia."

However, even though the revised treaty addressed almost all of Japan's complaints with the original treaty, and put the U.S.-Japan alliance on a much more equal footing, the notion of having any sort of security treaty at all with the United States was unpopular with broad sections of the Japanese public, who saw the treaty as allowing for Japan to once again become involved in a war. In 1959, the nationwide coalition that had successfully defeated Kishi's Police Duties Bill in 1958 had rebranded itself as the "People's Council for Preventing Revision of the Security Treaty" (Anpo Jōyaku Kaitei Soshi Kokumin Kaigi) and began recruiting additional member organizations and organizing protest activities against the revised Security Treaty. In a sign of things to come, radical student activists from the Zengakuren student federation and leftist labor unionists invaded the compound of the National Diet in November 1959 to express their anger at the Treaty, and in January, Zengakuren activists organized a sit-in in Tokyo's Haneda Airport to attempt to prevent Kishi from flying to Washington to sign the treaty, but were cleared away by police.

Because the new treaty was better than the old one, Kishi expected it to be ratified in relatively short order. Accordingly, he invited Eisenhower to visit Japan beginning on June 19, 1960, in part to celebrate the newly ratified treaty. If Eisenhower's visit had proceeded as planned, he would have become the first sitting US president to visit Japan. However, when debate on the treaty began in the Diet, the opposition Japan Socialist Party, abetted by Kishi's rivals in his own party, employed a variety of parliamentary tactics to drag out debate as long as possible, in hopes of preventing ratification before Eisenhower's planned arrival on June 19, and giving the extra-parliamentary protests more time to grow.

As the date of Eisenhower's planned visit drew near, Kishi grew increasingly desperate to ratify the treaty in time for his arrival. On May 19, 1960, Kishi suddenly called for a snap vote on the Treaty. When Socialist Diet members attempted a sit-in to block the vote, Kishi introduced 500 policemen into the Diet and had his political opponents physically dragged out by the police. Kishi then passed the revised Treaty with only members of his own party present. Kishi's anti-democratic actions during this "May 19 Incident" outraged much of the nation, with even conservative newspapers calling for Kishi's resignation. Thereafter, the anti-Treaty protest movement dramatically increased in size, with the Sōhyō labor federation carrying out a series of nationwide strikes and large crowds gathering around the National Diet on nearly a daily basis.

On June 10, White House Press Secretary James Hagerty arrived at Tokyo's Haneda Airport to make advance preparations for Eisenhower's impending arrival. Hagerty was picked up in a black car by US Ambassador to Japan Douglas MacArthur II, who deliberately provoked an international incident by ordering that the car be driven into a large crowd of protesters. MacArthur felt that if the demonstrators were going to resort to violence it would be better for both the US and Japanese governments to know rather than waiting to test their resolve at the arrival of the President. In the so-called "Hagerty Incident", the protesters surrounded the car, rocking it back and forth for more than an hour while standing on its roof, chanting anti-American slogans, and singing protest songs. Ultimately, MacArthur and Hagerty had to be rescued by a US Marines military helicopter.

On 15 June 1960, the radical student activists from Zengakuren attempted to storm the Diet compound once again, precipitating a fierce battle with police in which a female Tokyo University student named Michiko Kanba was killed. Kanba's death led to the largest demonstrations ever in Japanese history, against both police brutality and the treaty. By this point, Kishi had become so unpopular that all the LDP factions united to demand that he resign. In April 1960, across the Korea straits, South Korean president Syngman Rhee had been overthrown in the April Revolution, led by protesting university students, and at the time, there were serious fears in Japan that protests led by university students against the Kishi government might likewise lead to a revolution, making it imperative to ditch the very unpopular Kishi.

Desperate to stay in office long enough to host Eisenhower's visit, Kishi hoped to secure the streets in time for Eisenhower's arrival by calling out the Japan Self Defense Forces and tens of thousands of right-wing thugs that would be provided by his friend, the yakuza-affiliated right-wing "fixer" Yoshio Kodama. However, he was talked out of these extreme measures by his cabinet, and thereafter had no choice but to cancel Eisenhower's visit and take responsibility for the chaos by announcing on June 16 that he would resign within one month's time.

Despite Kishi's announcement, the anti-Treaty protests grew larger than ever, with the largest protest of the entire movement taking place on June 18. However, on June 19, the revised Security Treaty automatically took effect in accordance with Japanese law, 30 days after having passed the lower house of the Diet. On July 15, 1960, Kishi officially resigned and Hayato Ikeda became prime minister.

Stabbing incident

On July 14, 1960, Kishi was attacked by a knife-wielding assailant as he was leaving the prime minister's residence to host a garden party celebrating Hayato Ikeda's impending ascension to the premiership. The assailant was Taisuke Aramaki, an unemployed 65-year-old man affiliated with various right wing groups. Aramaki stabbed Kishi six times in the thigh, causing Kishi to bleed profusely, although Kishi survived because the blade had missed major arteries. Kishi was rushed to nearby hospital, where he received a total of 30 stitches to close his wounds. Reporters raced after him and climbed on stepladders to peer into his hospital room, with nurses angrily closing the curtains on them.

Aramaki was arrested at the scene, tried, found guilty, and sentenced to three years in prison in May 1962. Despite being unemployed, he had somehow been able to post a substantial bail during the intervening two years.

Aramaki never clearly stated the motivations for his attack. Despite the violent nature of the attack, Aramaki denied that he had intended to kill Kishi, later telling a reporter in an interview, "Yeah, I stabbed him six times, but if I wanted him dead, I would have just killed him." Aramaki told the same reporter that he had visited with the family of Michiko Kanba prior to his attack, perhaps suggesting that he sympathized with Kanba and blamed Kishi for her death. According to court records, Aramaki told police that he was angry at Kishi's mishandling of the Security Treaty crisis and wanted to "encourage Kishi to feel remorse."

However, some figures close to Kishi considered Aramaki's supposed anger in relation to the Anpo protests to be a cover story. In her 1992 memoir, Kishi's daughter Yōko wrote that Aramaki was "a paid assassin, who knew how to use a knife, who was hired by someone who hated my father and wanted to hurt him." In the prewar period, Aramaki had been secretary general of the right-wing ultranationalist Taikakai ("Great Reform Society"), and in the post-war period, he became a member of LDP factional leader Banboku Ōno's private extraparliamentary pressure group (ingaidan). Many LDP politicians felt that the stabbing had been carried out at Ōno's behest, as Ōno had openly hoped to succeed Kishi as prime minister and was known to be angry that Kishi had thrown his support behind Ikeda.

Curiously, Kishi was largely silent on the attack in his memoirs, devoting only two lines to it and saying only that he did not know the reason, and Kishi's brother Eisaku Satō did not even mention the attack in his diary entry for that day.

Later years

After taking power in a coup d'état in May 1961, the South Korean dictator General Park Chung-hee visited Japan in November 1961 to discuss establishing diplomatic relations between Japan and South Korea, which were finally achieved in 1965. Park had been a Japanese military officer serving in the Manchukuo Army and had fought with the Kwantung Army against guerrillas in Manchuria. During his visit to Japan, Park met with Kishi, and speaking in his fluent, albeit heavily Korean-accented Japanese, praised Japan for the "efficiency of the Japanese spirit", and said that he wanted to learn "good plans" from Japan for South Korea. Besides  fond reminiscences about the Japanese officers in Manchukuo who taught him about how to give a "good thrashing" to one's opponents, Park was very interested in Kishi's economic policies in Manchuria as a model for South Korea. Kishi told the Japanese press after his meeting with Park that he was a "little embarrassed" by Park's rhetoric, which was virtually unchanged from the sort of talk used by Japanese officers in World War II, with none of the concessions to the world of 1961 that Kishi himself employed. During his time as president of South Korea, Park launched the Five-Year Plans for the economic development of South Korea featuring statist economic policies that very closely resembled Five-Year Plan Kishi had administered in Manchukuo.

For the rest of his life, Kishi remained devoted to the cause of revising the Japanese Constitution to get rid of Article 9 and remilitarizing Japan. In 1965, Kishi gave a speech where he called for Japanese rearmament as "a means of eradicating completely the consequences of Japan's defeat and the American occupation. It is necessary to enable Japan finally to move out of the post-war era and for the Japanese people to regain their self-confidence and pride as Japanese." In his final years, Kishi grew increasingly bitter that constitutional revision had not yet come to pass. In his memoirs, he somewhat angrily recalled, "the idea of constitutional revision had always remained at the forefront of [my] mind... The two main culprits in destroying the momentum toward constitutional revision were Hayato Ikeda and my brother, Eisaku Satō, who, while they held power, made sure the constitution would remain unchanged. That is why the call for constitutional revision died with my administration."

Kishi remained in the Diet until retiring from politics in 1979. Even after he retired, he remained a strong influence behind the scenes in LDP politics. After several months of illness, Kishi died on August 7, 1987, at the age of 90.

Controversies

Accusations of corruption
Political scientist Richard Samuels has found extensive corruption during Kishi's time as prime minister. In February 1958, when the Indonesian president Sukarno visited Japan, the Tokyo police refused to provide security under the grounds that this was a private visit, not a state one. At that point, Kishi asked one of his close friends, the Yakuza gangster Yoshio Kodama, to provide thugs from the underworld for Sukarno's protection. During Sukarno's visit, Kishi negotiated a reparations agreement with Indonesia, where Japan agreed to provide compensation for war-time suffering. Kishi's reasons for paying reparations to Indonesia had less to do with guilt over the Japanese occupation and more to do with the chances to engage in questionable contracts to reward his friends as Kishi insisted that Japan would only pay reparations in the form of goods, not money. In April 1958, Kishi told the Indonesian Foreign Minister Soebandrio that he wanted Indonesia to ask to receive reparations in the form of ships built exclusively by the Kinoshita Trading Company-which happened to be run by Kinoshita Shigeru, a metal merchant and an old friend of Kishi's from their Manchurian days in the 1930s-even though the Kinoshita company had never built ships before, and there were many other well-established Japanese shipbuilders who could have provided ships at a lower price. All of the reparations contracts to the various states of South-East Asia during Kishi's time as Prime Minister went to firms run by businessmen who were closely associated with him during his time in Manchuria in the 1930s. Additionally, there were frequent claims that when it came time to award reparations contracts, high-ranking Indonesian politicians had to receive kickbacks, and that ordinary Indonesians never received any benefits from the reparations.

During the same period, there were questions about the M-fund, a secret American fund intended to stabilize Japan economically. The American Assistant Attorney General Norbert Schlei alleged, "Beginning with Prime Minister Kishi, the Fund has been treated as a private preserve of the individuals into whose control it has fallen. Those individuals have felt able to appropriate huge sums from the Fund for their own personal and political purposes... The litany of abuses begins with Kishi who, after obtaining control of the fund from (then Vice President Richard) Nixon, helped himself to a fortune of one trillion yen."

Release of war criminals
Like many of his fellow conservatives in Japan, Kishi believed that Japan's war in Asia and the Pacific had been a war not of aggression but of self-defense, and thus that the treatment of himself and his colleagues as "war criminals" was unjustified and merely an example of victor's justice. As Prime Minister, he pressured the Eisenhower administration into expediting the release of convicted Class B and Class C war criminals. He also sought to commemorate executed Class A war criminals. In 1960, Kishi was involved in dedicating, on Mount Sangane in Aichi prefecture, a headstone to General Tojo and six other military leaders executed after the Tokyo war crimes trial, marking their grave as that of "the seven patriots who died for their country."

Connections to Unification Church

Beginning in the mid-1960s, Kishi developed connections to the Unification Church (UC, sometimes known as the "Moonies") in Japan. The sect shared Kishi's commitment to anti-communism and enjoyed protection from prosecution by the LDP. Kishi was publicly known as a friend of the sect’s leader Sun Myung Moon (1920-2012). Their headquarters in Japan was built “on land in Tokyo once owned by Kishi." When Moon was convicted and jailed for tax evasion in the United States, Kishi wrote a letter asking President Ronald Reagan correct the "injustice" and release Moon. At this point, the UC's forcible recruitment of young people in Japan had already become an anti-social problem, but Kishi evaluated the leader of the cult as "sincere and valuable." The relationship between the Kishi and Abe families and the UC was maintained even after that. The LDP/UC cooperation has carried on until the present day.

Personal life and descendants 

In 1919, Kishi married his cousin , and was adopted by her parents. Their son Nobukazu was born in 1921, and their daughter Yōko was born in 1928.

Kishi's daughter Yōko Kishi married politician Shintarō Abe. Their second son, Shinzō Abe, served as prime minister of Japan from 2006 to 2007 and again from 2012 to 2020. Their third son, Nobuo Kishi, was adopted by Kishi's son Nobukazu shortly after birth, lived with Kishi during the later years of his life, won Kishi's historical Diet seat in 2012, and became Minister of Defense in 2020.

Honors 
From the corresponding article in the Japanese Wikipedia

Coronation Medal (10 November 1928)
Order of the Sacred Treasure, 5th Class (April 1934)
Military Medal of Honor (April 1934)
Grand Cordon of the Order of the Rising Sun with Paulownia Flowers (29 April 1967)
Grand Cordon of the Order of the Chrysanthemum (7 August 1987; posthumous)

Order of precedence
Senior second rank (August 1987; posthumous)
Senior third rank (July 1960)
Fourth rank (October 1940)
Senior fifth rank (September 1934)
Fifth rank (September 1929)
Senior sixth rank (September 1927)
Sixth rank (August 1925)
Senior seventh rank (October 1923)
Seventh rank (May 1921)

Foreign Honors
 : Sash of the Order of the Aztec Eagle (5 August 1959)
 : Grand Cross 1st Class of the Order of Merit of the Federal Republic of Germany (1960)
 : Grand Cordon of the Order of Propitious Clouds (19 November 1969)
  United Nations: Peace Medal (28 August 1979)

References

Citations

Works cited

Books

Articles

 

1896 births
1987 deaths
20th-century prime ministers of Japan
Prime Ministers of Japan
Foreign ministers of Japan
Japanese defense ministers
Government ministers of Japan
Members of the House of Representatives (Empire of Japan)
Members of the House of Representatives (Japan)
Far-right politics in Japan
Japanese anti-communists
Japanese fascists
Japanese nationalists
Japanese biological weapons program
Japanese rapists
People of Manchukuo
Japanese people of World War II
University of Tokyo alumni
Recipients of the Order of the Paulownia Flowers
Grand Crosses 1st class of the Order of Merit of the Federal Republic of Germany
Democratic Party (Japan, 1954) politicians
Liberal Democratic Party (Japan) politicians
Imperial Rule Assistance Association politicians
Shinzo Abe
Tabuse, Yamaguchi
Politicians from Yamaguchi Prefecture
Historical negationism
Stabbing survivors
War criminals